Sutro is a surname. Notable people with the surname include:

  (1784–1869), German rabbi in Gelsenkirchen
 Adolph Sutro (1830–1898), Mayor of San Francisco
 Florence Sutro (1865–1906), musician and painter, sister-in-law of Adolph and Otto Sutro
 Otto Sutro (1833–1896), Adolph's brother, a musician of Baltimore
 Alfred Sutro (1863–1933), British playwright
 Rose and Ottilie Sutro (1870–1957 and 1872–1970), daughters of Otto, one of the first piano duo teams
 John Sutro (1903–1985), British film producer
 John Sutro (American football) (born 1940)

See also
 Sutro, Nevada
 Sutro Tunnel in Nevada
 Sutro District in San Francisco, containing:
 Sutro Baths
 Sutro Heights Park
 Mount Sutro in San Francisco
 Sutro Tower on Mount Sutro
 Sutro Library, San Francisco branch of the California State Library
 Sutro's gum tree ranch in San Francisco's Glen Canyon Park

Jewish surnames
Surnames of German origin